Graham Pfuhl (born 23 August 1950) is a South African cricketer. He played in twelve first-class and four List A matches for Border from 1981/82 to 1983/84.

See also
 List of Border representative cricketers

References

External links
 

1950 births
Living people
South African cricketers
Border cricketers
Cricketers from Cape Town